"Someone You Used to Know" is a song written by Tim Johnson and Rory Feek, and recorded by American country music singer Collin Raye.  It was released in August 1998 as the second single from his CD The Walls Came Down.  The song peaked at #3 on the U.S. Billboard country music charts and #5 on the Canadian RPM Country Tracks.  It also peaked at #37 on the Billboard Hot 100 becoming Raye's biggest crossover hit.

Chart performance
The song debuted at number 65 on the Billboard Hot Country Singles & Tracks chart dated August 22, 1998.

Year-end charts

References

1998 singles
1998 songs
Collin Raye songs
Song recordings produced by Paul Worley
Song recordings produced by Billy Joe Walker Jr.
Songs written by Rory Feek
Songs written by Tim Johnson (songwriter)
Epic Records singles